Federal Building and Post Office, and variations such as prefixed by Old, may refer to:

Main Post Office and Federal Building (Oakland, California), listed on the National Register of Historic Places (NRHP) in Alameda County
U.S. Post Office, Courthouse and Federal Building (Sacramento, California), Sacramento, California, NRHP-listed
Cañon City Post Office and Federal Building, Cañon City, Colorado, NRHP-listed in Fremont County
US Post Office and Federal Building–Delta Main, Delta, Colorado, NRHP-listed in Delta County
U.S. Post Office and Federal Building (Denver, Colorado), Denver, Colorado, NRHP-listed
US Post Office and Federal Building–Monte Vista Main, Monte Vista, Colorado, NRHP-listed in Rio Grande County
US Post Office, Federal Building, and Federal Courthouse–Sterling Main, Sterling, Colorado, NRHP-listed in Logan County
U. S. Post Office and Federal Building (Hartford, Connecticut), Hartford, Connecticut, NRHP-listed
U.S. Post Office–Federal Building (Sarasota, Florida), NRHP-listed
Federal Building, U.S. Courthouse, Downtown Postal Station, Tampa, Florida, NRHP-listed
 Old U.S. Post Office and Federal Building (Macon, Georgia), NRHP-listed
Terre Haute Post Office and Federal Building, Terre Haute, Indiana, NRHP-listed
Federal Building–US Post Office (Independence, Kansas), Independence, Kansas, NRHP-listed in Montgomery County
US Post Office and Federal Building–Salina, Salina, Kansas, NRHP-listed in Saline County
United States Post Office and Federal Building (Wichita, Kansas), NRHP-listed in Sedgwick County
Federal Building and US Post Office–Owensboro, Owensboro, Kentucky, listed on the NRHP in Kentucky
Old U.S. Post Office and Federal Building (Aberdeen, Mississippi), a Mississippi Landmark
Old U.S. Post Office and Federal Building (Oxford, Mississippi), a Mississippi Landmark
Lewistown Federal Building & Post Office, Lewistown, Montana, NRHP-listed in Fergus County
 Federal Building and Post Office (Fallon, Nevada), NRHP-listed
 Federal Building and Post Office (New York, New York), NRHP-listed
U. S. Post Office and Federal Building (Rockingham, North Carolina), Rockingham, North Carolina, NRHP-listed
Akron Post Office and Federal Building, Akron, Ohio, NRHP-listed
 Old Federal Building and Post Office (Cleveland, Ohio), NRHP-listed
Old Post Office and Federal Building (Dayton, Ohio), Dayton, Ohio, listed on the NRHP in Ohio
US Post Office and Federal Building–Zanesville, Zanesville, Ohio, NRHP-listed
Post Office, Courthouse, and Federal Office Building, Oklahoma City, Oklahoma, NRHP-listed
U.S. Post Office and Federal Building (La Grande, Oregon), La Grande, Oregon, NRHP-listed
U.S. Post Office and Federal Building (Austin, Texas), Austin, Texas, NRHP-listed
US Post Office–Federal Building–Brenham, Brenham, Texas, listed on the NRHP in Texas
Lubbock Post Office and Federal Building, Lubbock, Texas, listed on the NRHP in Texas
US Post Office and Federal Building (Port Arthur, Texas), Port Arthur, TX, listed on the NRHP in Texas
Post Office and Federal Building (San Antonio, Texas), included in the Alamo Plaza Historic District
 Old Federal Building and Post Office (Victoria, Texas), listed on the NRHP in Texas
U.S. Post Office – Downtown Tacoma, also known as "U.S. Post Office – Downtown Tacoma – Federal Building", Tacoma, Washington, NRHP-listed in Pierce County

See also
List of United States post offices
List of United States federal courthouses

Federal buildings